This is a list of current and past models sold by Mitsubishi Motors.

Current models

References

Lists of cars